Ah Koy is a surname. Notable people with the surname include:

 Rachel Ah Koy (born 1989), Fijian swimmer
 James Ah Koy (born 1936), Fijian businessman and politician